Sir Ashok Jivraj Rabheru  (6 April 1952 – 23 December 2022) was a British businessman. He served as a trustee for the Duke of Edinburgh's Award from 2000 to 2010, and was a core member of the steering group to raise funds for its Golden Jubilee anniversary in 2006. He was chairman of the joint funding board for UK and international engagements.

Early life and education
Rabheru was born in Morogoro, Tanzania, and emigrated to the United Kingdom when he was 15 years old. He earned his degree from University College London in (B.Sc.). He also held an (M.Phil.) from Royal Holloway, University of London in Applied Mathematics.

Career
Rabheru started his IT career by forming Genisys Group in the year 1985 with just 5 employees and today the company has grown to be a global IT services provider with 1000+ employees. Over the last three decades, the company has helped enterprises reimagine their businesses in the digital world, by offering comprehensive IT solutions backed with experience, commitment and strategy.

Social and charitable work
Rabheru served as a Trustee  for DofE from 2000 to 2010 and was the core member of the steering group to raise funds for the Golden Jubilee anniversary for DofE in the year 2006. He worked as Chairman of the Joint funding board for the UK and International engagements.

Rabheru was also an active supporter of charities like Combat Stress, Debra and also worked with the Asian community.

Personal life and death
Rabheru was married to Harshida Jivraj Rabheru  having triplets: Rishi, Shayan and Nikita, and lived in Buckinghamshire.

Rabheru died on 23 December 2022, at the age of 70.

Honours and awards 
Rabheru was appointed Commander of the Royal Victorian Order (CVO) in the 2011 New Year Honours and Knight Commander of the Royal Victorian Order (KCVO) in the 2022 Birthday Honours.

Rabheru was also appointed Deputy Lieutenant of Buckinghamshire in 2011.

References

External links 
 New Year Honors

1952 births
2022 deaths
British businesspeople
Businesspeople awarded knighthoods
Knights Commander of the Royal Victorian Order
Deputy Lieutenants of Buckinghamshire
Tanzanian emigrants to the United Kingdom
People from Morogoro Region